The Justice Party (Armenian: Արդարություն, Ardarutyun), also known as the Justice Alliance was a progressive electoral coalition, consisting of nine different political parties in Armenia.

History
The electoral alliance was created by Stepan Demirchyan, leader of the People's Party of Armenia in 2003.

Prior to the 2003 Armenian parliamentary election, the Justice coalition listed 136
candidates to run in the election across Armenia. Some candidates from other minor parties were also included in the list, to which they were affiliated with the coalition, but not formally part of it. Following the 2003 election, the Justice coalition won 13.6% of the popular vote and 14 out of 131 seats. It became the second largest group within the National Assembly and had won the second largest percentage of the popular vote.

The People's Party of Armenia often regarded itself as the lead party within the coalition, however, other member parties disputed this.

The coalition dissolved prior to the 2007 Armenian parliamentary elections due to internal divisions among members. Some of the members chose to run independently in the 2007 elections.

Ideology
Since the coalition consisted of several political parties, each party supported various ideologies. During an interview, Stepan Demirchyan stated, "We should strive for good neighborly relations with our neighbors, we are in favor of European integration, we attach importance to relations with Russia and the United States. I do not see any contradiction here. Armenia must pursue a balanced foreign policy."

See also

Politics of Armenia
Programs of political parties in Armenia

References

2003 establishments in Armenia
Defunct political party alliances in Armenia
Political parties established in 2003
Political parties with year of disestablishment missing
Progressive parties